Markus Heppke (born 11 April 1986 in Essen) is a German footballer who plays as a midfielder for SpVg Schonnebeck.

Career
He was 20 years old when he made his first appearance in the Bundesliga in an away game at Energie Cottbus on 18 November 2006. He was part of the Schalke Youth Team that won the Youth DFB-Pokal in 2005. On 1 January 2009, Heppke transferred to Rot-Weiß Oberhausen. In 2016 he transferred from SV Hönnepel-Niedermörmter to SV Schonnebeck and works as a physiotherapist at the Krupp-Krankenhaus.

Early life
Heppke completed his abitur at the Gesamtschule Berger Feld.

References

External links
 

1986 births
Living people
German footballers
FC Schalke 04 players
Rot-Weiß Oberhausen players
Rot-Weiss Essen players
Association football midfielders
FC Schalke 04 II players
Bundesliga players
2. Bundesliga players
People educated at the Gesamtschule Berger Feld
Footballers from Essen